is a Yoko-sutemi (橫捨身技): side sacrifice throw in Judo.  It is one of the techniques adopted later by the Kodokan into their Shinmeisho No Waza (newly accepted techniques) list.  It is categorized as a side sacrifice technique, Yoko-sutemi.

See also
The Canon Of Judo

References

External links
 https://web.archive.org/web/20060813212947/http://judoinfo.com/images/animations/blue/haraimakikomi.htm www.judoinfo.com
 https://www.youtube.com/watch?v=Tg4xx9n_EQ4 Harai makikomi video 

Judo technique
Grappling
Grappling hold
Grappling positions
Martial art techniques